The Fredrick Christian Sorensen House, on E. Center St. in Ephraim, Utah, was built in c.1870.  It was listed on the National Register of Historic Places in 1980.

It is an adobe one-and-a-half-story pair-house with its front facade including one window into each of its side rooms, and window-door-window into its center room.

References

Pair-houses
Houses on the National Register of Historic Places in Utah
Houses completed in 1870
Sanpete County, Utah